, Thailand had 310 colleges, universities, and tertiary academic institutes. This is a categorized listing of institutions of higher learning in Thailand.



Public universities and colleges 
Public universities were formerly called "government universities" and were fully supported by the government. Currently they are independent as government-supported public universities. However, their staff are no longer civil servants. Application is by annual nationwide competitive admission examination or occasionally by special direct application.

Autonomous universities 
Autonomous universities have their own administrative structure and budgeting system for self-governance and full autonomy, allowing decision making on administrative and management matters to be handled by the university itself.

Rajabhat Universities 

There are 40 universities in the Rajabhat Universities system. The universities are designed to provide higher education in provinces. They were formerly called Rajabhat Institutes and originally emerged as colleges of education. Admission is by competitive direct application. Some Rajabhat Universities have several campuses such as Suan Sunandha Rajabhat University.

Rajamangala Universities of Technology 
The Rajamangala University of Technology system includes nine schools. It was formerly a polytechnic institute system and then was renamed "Rajamangala Institute of Technology" before being granted university status. Admission is by direct application.

Military and police academies

College  
Office of the Vocational Education Commission supervised 416 institutions all over the country for producing and developing professional manpower of the vocational certificate, diploma in technical education and Bachelor’s degree in various fields of technology and operation. There are 9 programs comprising more than 350 subject areas. The Management Centers have been established in 5 regions to promote academic work and develop vocational education in 77 provinces. The management of vocational education colleges at provincial level is linked together. Types of colleges can be found as follows:

Education agency and institutes

Private universities and colleges

Universities 

The Ministry of University Affairs's (MUA) Directory of Schools and Universities.

Institutes

Colleges

Intergovernmental institute

Renowned foreign higher education institutes 
In 2017, the government issued a decree to promote the establishment of renowned foreign higher education institute in the country. The decree allowed foreign institutes to set up entities in EEC or collaborate with local public universities to setup entities that can award their own degrees.

Joint schools 
 Joint Graduate School of Energy and Environment (JGSEE)
 Thailand Graduate Institute of Science and Technology (TGIST)
 Thailand Advanced Institute of Science and Technology (TAIST)

Groups of universities 
 LAOTSE
 Greater Mekong Sub-region Academic and Research Network

See also

Lists of universities and colleges by country

Lists of universities and colleges
Education in Thailand
List of schools in Thailand
List of medical schools in Thailand

References 

127  MAELAO DISTRICT NIE CENTRE ศูนย์การศึกษานอกระบบและการศึกษาตามอัธยาศัยอำเภอแม่ลาว  เว็บไซต์ http://ml.ac.th/

External links
 

Universities and colleges in Thailand
Universities
 
Thailand
Thailand